In geology, the Inner Hebrides Group is a lithostratigraphical division containing  a range of rocks mainly of  Late Cretaceous age which occur around the west coast of the Scottish Highlands. It comprises the following formations:

 Beinn Iadain Mudstone Formation
 Strathaird Limestone Formation
 Feorlin Sandstone Formation
 Griburn Chalk Formation
 Coire Riabhach Phosphatic Formation
 Lochaline White Sandstone Formation
 Morvern Greensand Formation

The Clach Alasdair Conglomerate Member and the Laig Gorge Sandstone & Limestone Members are rock units below formation level, assigned to the Strathaird Limestone Formation.

Each of these formations is of limited geographical extent, the Scottish Chalk Province being fragmented amongst the islands of Skye, Eigg and Mull and the adjacent Scottish mainland district of Morvern. Each of the rock units has gone by different names in the past - the succession outlined here is based on an interpretation by the British Geological Survey reflecting more recent survey and age analysis. It is likely that the youngest of these formations, the Beinn Iadain Mudstone Formation, is largely of Paleogene age. The Group as a whole is the age equivalent of the Chalk Group of southern England.

References 

Geology of Scotland